Voyetskoye is a rural locality (a selo) in Sharipovsky Selsoviet, Kushnarenkovsky District, Bashkortostan, Russia. The population was 74 as of 2010. There are 2 streets.

Geography 
Voyetskoye is located 27 km southeast of Kushnarenkovo (the district's administrative centre) by road. Verkhneakbashevo is the nearest rural locality.

References 

Rural localities in Kushnarenkovsky District